Ó h-Aichir is an Irish surname also rendered as Ó hEithir, Ó Hehir, O'Hehir, Hehir, or Hare.

It is a sept of Clare which originated with the Uí Fidhgheinte of Limerick.

People 

People with this surname or a variant of it include:

 Diana O'Hehir
 Jack Hehir
 Martin Hehir
 Michael O'Hehir
 Paddy Hehir
 Patrick Hehir
 Peter Hehir
 William Hehir
 Breandán Ó hEithir

See also 

 O'Hare (surname)
 O'Hara
 O'Hair

Annalistic references 

 AI1095.13 A great mortality of the men of Ireland, so that it is impossible to enumerate all the people that died. From that pestilence died ... the daughter of Ua Lugda, mother of Ua Flaithbertaig [and] the wife of Donnchadh Ua hAichir.
 AI1099.2 Donnchadh Ua hAichir, the most hospitable man in Tuadmumu, rested.

External links 

 http://www.ucc.ie/celt/published/T100004/index.html

Surnames
Irish families
Surnames of Irish origin
Irish-language masculine surnames
Families of Irish ancestry